The Triple Crown of Motorsport is an unofficial achievement for motor racing drivers that is generally regarded as winning motorsport's three most prestigious races. These annual events are the 24 Hours of Le Mans endurance race at the Circuit de la Sarthe, the Indianapolis 500 for American open-wheel racing cars at the Indianapolis Motor Speedway, and the Monaco Grand Prix for Formula One cars at the Circuit de Monaco. The Indianapolis 500 was introduced in 1911, followed by the 24 Hours of Le Mans in 1923 and the Monaco Grand Prix in 1929. As the Indianapolis 500 and the Monaco Grand Prix are both traditionally held on the last weekend of May, it is impossible for modern drivers to enter all three Triple Crown events in the same year. No trophy is awarded to the driver who completes the Triple Crown. 

, 253 drivers from 23 different countries have won a Triple Crown race and only Graham Hill has completed the Triple Crown. Tom Kristensen has won the most Triple Crown races with nine victories, all at the 24 Hours of Le Mans, which is a record for the most victories at the event; Hill claimed two fewer in total, including five victories at Monaco. Ayrton Senna won six Triple Crown events, all at the Monaco Grand Prix, placing him alongside Jacky Ickx in joint-third overall and breaking Hill's record for the most race wins at Monaco. With four victories each, Hélio Castroneves, A. J. Foyt, Rick Mears and Al Unser hold the joint record for the most Indianapolis 500 wins. 

There have been 19 drivers who have partaken in all three Triple Crown races and have achieved victory in at least one of them. No one has won all three Triple Crown races during the course of a calendar year. Fernando Alonso, Foyt, Bruce McLaren, Juan Pablo Montoya, Tazio Nuvolari, Jochen Rindt and Maurice Trintignant are the seven drivers to have won two of the three Triple Crown events. Of those seven, only Montoya has won both the Indianapolis 500 and the Monaco Grand Prix, while only Foyt has won both the 24 Hours of Le Mans and the Indianapolis 500. The remaining five won both the 24 Hours of Le Mans and the Monaco Grand Prix.

Winners

Notes

References

Bibliography
 
 
 

Sports car racing
Formula One
Monaco Grand Prix
24 Hours of Le Mans
Indianapolis 500
Motorsport terminology